Joseph A. Kramm (September 30, 1907 – May 8, 1991) was an American playwright, actor, and director. He received the Pulitzer Prize for Drama in 1951 for his play The Shrike, later adapted into a motion picture of the same title in 1955. His wife, stage actress Isabel Bonner, died of a brain hemorrhage while performing his play in 1955.

Works

Plays
The Cry of the Watchman (1947)
Giants, Sons of Giants (Jan. 6–13, 1962)
The Shrike (November 25, 1953 - December 6, 1953, revived January 15, 1952 - May 31, 1952)

References

External links

1907 births
1991 deaths
Pulitzer Prize for Drama winners
20th-century American male actors
20th-century American dramatists and playwrights
American male dramatists and playwrights
20th-century American male writers